Emanuel Medical Center is a 209-bed acute care hospital located in Turlock, Calif. Hospital services include 24-hour emergency care, the only heart attack receiving center between Modesto and Fresno, an advanced center for mothers and newborns, rehabilitation and therapy, and more. The Emanuel Cancer Center provides specialized cancer services that include diagnosis, treatment and support.

Management
Tenet Healthcare completed the acquisition of Emanuel Medical Center on August 1, 2014.

Key Services
General and specialty medical services offered at Emanuel Medical Center include:
 Cardiovascular 
 Diagnostic Imaging
 Emergency Department
 Gastroenterology
 General Surgery
 Gynecology
 Laboratory Medicine
 Obstetrics
 Oncology
 Orthopedics
 Pediatrics
 Physical Therapy

References

External links
 Official website
 This hospital in the CA Healthcare Atlas A project by OSHPD

Tenet Healthcare
Hospital buildings completed in 1917
1917 establishments in California
Hospitals in California
Buildings and structures in Stanislaus County, California
Turlock, California